Ivan Petriak (born 13 March 1994) is a professional Ukrainian football midfielder who plays for Shakhtar Donetsk. Since 2012, he has played for the junior and youth national team of Ukraine. In March 2016, he made his debut in the national team of Ukraine, for which he played 5 matches.

Career
He made his debut for the main Zorya team as a substitute in the second half in a match against Shakhtar Donetsk in the Ukrainian Premier League on 2 October 2011.

On 28 February 2016, he signed a contract with Shakhtar Donetsk for the next season.

On 8 July 2018, Petryak moved to the Hungarian club Fehérvár FC.

On 22 August 2022, he signed a contract with Shakhtar Donetsk for the next season.

Career statistics
.

References

External links 
 
 

1994 births
Living people
People from Smila
Piddubny Olympic College alumni
Ukrainian footballers
Ukrainian expatriate footballers
FC Zorya Luhansk players
Ukrainian Premier League players
Ukraine international footballers
FC Shakhtar Donetsk players
Association football midfielders
Nemzeti Bajnokság I players
Ferencvárosi TC footballers
Fehérvár FC players
Expatriate footballers in Hungary
Ukrainian expatriate sportspeople in Hungary
Sportspeople from Cherkasy Oblast
Ukraine youth international footballers
Ukraine under-21 international footballers